Sholeh Wolpé is an Iranian-born American poet, editor, playwright, and literary translator. She was born in Iran, and lived in Trinidad and England during her teenage years, before settling in the United States. She lives in Los Angeles.

Biography
Sholeh Wolpé was born in 1962 in Tehran, Pahlavi Iran, and spent most of her teen years in Trinidad and the United Kingdom before settling in the United States. She previously lived in Redlands, California.

She attended George Washington University and received a B.A. degree in Radio/TV/Film. Followed by studies at Northwestern University and received a M.A. degree in Radio/TV/Film and Johns Hopkins University and received a MHS in Public Health.

The Poetry Foundation has written that “Wolpé’s concise, unflinching, and often wry free verse explores violence, culture, and gender. So many of Wolpé’s poems deal with the violent situation in the Middle East, yet she is ready to both bravely and playfully refuse to let death be too proud.”

Wolpe's literary translations have garnered several prestigious awards. Wolpé was named a 2020–2021 "Cultural Trailblazer" by the City of Los Angeles, Department of Cultural Affairs. She is a Writer-In-Residence at University of California, Irvine.

Literary career
A recipient of 2014 PEN Heim Translation Fund grant, 2014 Hedgebrook Residency, the 2013 Midwest Book Award, and 2010 Lois Roth Persian Translation prize, Wolpé literary work includes five collections of poetry, four books of translations, three anthologies and several plays.

Wolpé’s first collection, The Scar Saloon, was lauded by Billy Collins as “poems that cast a light on some of what we all hold in common.” Poet and novelist Chris Abani called the poems "political, satirical, and unflinching in the face of war, tyranny and loss ... they transmute experience into the magic of the imagined."

The poems in Wolpé’s second collection, Rooftops of Tehran, were called by poet Nathalie Handal “as vibrant as they are brave,” and Richard Katrovas wrote that its publication was a “truly rare event: an important book of poetry.”

Wolpé’s translations of the Iranian poet Forugh Farrokhzad’s selected work, Sin, was awarded the Lois Roth Persian Translation Award in 2010. The judges wrote that they “found themselves experiencing Forugh’s Persian poems with new eyes.” Alicia Ostriker praised the translations as “hypnotic in their beauty and force.” Willis Barnstone found them “extravagantly majestic,” and of such order that “they resurrect Forugh.”

Sholeh Wolpé and Mohsen Emadi’s translations of Walt Whitman’s "Song of Myself" (آواز خويشتن) were commissioned by the University of Iowa’s International Program. They are currently on University of Iowa’s Whitman website and will be available in print in Iran.

Robert Olen Butler lauded Wolpé's anthology, Breaking the Jaws of Silence as “a deeply humane and aesthetically exhilarating collection.” Wolpé's 2012 anthology, The Forbidden: Poems from Iran and Its Exiles, a recipient of the 2013 Midwest Book Award, includes many of Wolpé’s own translations, and was called by American poet Sam Hamil a “most welcome gift” that “embraces and illuminates our deepest human bonds and hopes.”

Wolpé’s Iran Edition of the Atlanta Review became that journal’s best-selling issue. Wolpé is also a regional editor of Tablet and Pen: Literary Landscapes from The Modern Middle East (edited by Reza Aslan), and a contributing editor of the Los Angeles Review of Books.

Wolpé’s modern translation of The Conference of the Birds by the 12th Century Iranian Sufi mystic poet "Attar", was lauded by PEN lauded as an “artful and exquisite modern translation.” About the book, W.W. Norton & Co writes: "Wolpé re-creates the intense beauty of the original Persian in contemporary English verse and poetic prose, fully capturing for the first time the beauty and timeless wisdom of Attar’s masterpiece for modern readers."

In 2019 Wolpé began a collaboration with composer Fahad Siadat and choreographer Andre Megerdichian which culminated in The Conference of the Birds- An Oratorio. the work garnered support form the National Endowment for the Arts, Farhang Foundation, Scripps College, among others. 

Abacus of Loss - A Memoir in Verse is Wolpé's 2022 genre re-defining book in which Wolpé combines several genres (memoir, poetry, and reportage) to shape and deliver her story in a philosophically pantheistic format. It does not follow the arrow of time and explores the grey areas in her (and our) inner and outer world. The outer, is her story, the inner draws us in and becomes our story too. "Though she’s tallying her—and our—collective losses (personally, culturally, and globally), Wolpé also expresses deep thankfulness for what we still have left."

Playwright 
In 2017, Wolpé’s play "Shame" was performed as part of the Women Playwrights Series (WPS) at Centenary Stage Co. in Hackettstown, New Jersey.

Her play "The Conference of the Birds" is an adaptation of 12th-century Sufi mystic, Attar's epic poem and world premiered on November 30, 2018 at Ubuntu Theater.

Music 
Wolpe's poems and translations have been set to music by various composers, including Hubba De Graaf, Fahad Siadat, Shawn Crouch, Niloufar Nourbakhsh, Sahba Aminikia,  and Mamak Khadem, and Sahba Motallebi. She has written lyrics for American jazz band San Gabriel 7.

Publications

Editor 

 
 Atlanta Review, volume XVI — Iran Issue 2010 guest edited by Sholeh Wolpe

Translator

Anthologies 
Wolpe's work can be found in the following anthologies:

  
 
 
 
 The Heart of a Stranger: An Anthology of Exile Literature, edited by André Naffis-Sahely, Pushkin Press, 2019.
 Ink Knows No Borders, edited by Patrice Vicchione and Alyssa Rayond, Seven Stories Press, 2019.
 
 Making Mirrors: Writing//Righting by Refugees, edited by Becky Thompson and Jehan Bseiso. Interlink Publishing Group, September 2018.
 The Golden Shovel Anthology (University of Arkansas Press, 2017)
Others Will Enter the Gates: Immigrant Poets on Poetry, Influences and Writing in America (Black Lawrence Press, 2015) 
Wide Awake: Poets of Los Angeles and Beyond, (Pacific Coast Poetry Series, 2015)
Veils, Halos, and Shackles: International Poetry on the Oppression and Empowerment of Women, (Kasva Press, 2015)
Flash Fiction Funny: 82 Very Short Humorous Stories (Blue Light Press, 2013)
Al-Mutanabbi Street Starts Here: Poets and Writers Respond to the March 5th, 2007, Bombing of Baghdad's "Street of the Booksellers" (PM Press, 2012)
How To Free a Naked Man from a Rock: An Anthology (Red Hen Press, 2011)
Sudden Flash Youth: 65 Short Short Stories (Persea Books, April 2011)

The Forbidden: Poems from Iran and its exiles (Michigan State University, 2012)
Tablet & Pen: Literary Landscapes from the Modern Middle East (W W Norton 2010)
Rumpus Original Poetry Anthology (The Rumpus, 2012)
Language for a New Century: Contemporary Poetry from the Middle East, Asia & Beyond (Norton, 2008)
Powwow: American Short Fiction from Then to Now (Da Capo Press, an imprint of the Perseus Books Group Inc., 2009)
The Poetry of Iranian Woman, A contemporary anthology (Reelcontent, 2009)
Been There, Read That: The Armchair Traveler's Companion (Victoria University Press, 2008)
In Our Own Words—A Generation Defining Itself (MW Enterprises, New York 2007)
Evensong: Contemporary Poems of Spirituality (Bottom Dog Press, 2006)
Yellow as Turmeric, Fragrant as Cloves, — An anthology of Asian American Female Poets (Deep Bowl Press, Feb. 2008)
Inlandia: A Literary Journey Through California's Inland Empire (Heyday Books, 2006)

The Other Side of Sorrow (Poetry Society of New Hampshire 2006)
Strange Times, My Dear: The PEN Anthology of Contemporary Iranian Literature (Arcade Publishing, April 2005)
So Luminous the Wildflowers, An Anthology of California Poets (Tebot Bach, 2003)

References

External links

Living people
People from Tehran
George Washington University alumni
Northwestern University alumni
Johns Hopkins Bloomberg School of Public Health alumni
Iranian translators
Persian–English translators
1962 births
21st-century American poets
American women poets
Iranian women poets
21st-century American women writers
20th-century Iranian women writers
20th-century Iranian poets
21st-century Iranian women writers
21st-century Iranian poets
Translators of Forough Farrokhzad
Poets from Tehran